KTJM (98.5 MHz) is a commercial FM radio station licensed to Port Arthur, Texas.  It is owned by Estrella Media and airs a Regional Mexican radio format.  The studios and offices are located at 3000 Bering Drive in Southwest Houston.  Programming is simulcast with sister station 101.7 KNTE Bay City, Texas.

KTJM has an effective radiated power (ERP) of 100,000 watts, the highest permitted for non-grandfathered FM stations in the U.S.  The transmitter is on Cleveland Street in Devers, Texas. With the tall tower located roughly halfway between Houston and Beaumont, KTJM is able to cover both radio markets.

History
The station signed on in 1963 as KPAC-FM, owned by Port Arthur College, simulcasting sister station 1250 AM KPAC.  It operated with a 960-watt signal on a 500-foot tower it shared with 1250 AM.  Afterwards, KPAC-FM became an automated Beautiful Music station, playing instrumental cover versions of popular songs, as well as Broadway and Hollywood show tunes.

The station changed its call sign to KHYS in 1978, flipping to an album rock format after the AM and FM pair were bought by San Antonio based-Clear Channel Communications. In the mid 1980s, the format changed again, this time to Urban Adult Contemporary as "Y98.5, The Best Variety Of Hits and Dusties."

In 1988, a 2,000-foot tower was built near Devers for the station. The format changed to Urban Contemporary, using the moniker "Kiss 98.5."  That put KHYS in head-to-head competition with KMJQ, "Majic 102".

KYOK 1590 AM flipped from Gospel to Rap as "Yo 1590 Raps!" in February 1991, leading KHYS to change back to "Y98.5", with the slogan "Y98.5 Is Back, playing the best variety of Hits and Dusties."

In 1993, 103.3 KJOJ-FM and 1590 KYOK began simulcasting "Y98.5". KJOJ-FM continued to simulcast with 98.5 until December 2020. The station would play Smooth Jazz on Sundays.

The station started playing Smooth Jazz on Sundays.  It proved so popular that on March 8, 1995, the simulcast flipped full time to Smooth Jazz, known as "Smooth FM 98.5 and 103.3".

On February 24, 1997, after stunting with continuous play of the song Kiss by Prince, the station's format changed to Rhythmic Contemporary as "Kiss 98-5, Kiss Again 103-3".  The stations targeted the Hispanic youth market by playing heavy doses of Latin Freestyle and House music, mimicking the style of WPOW Power 96 in Miami. In June 1998, the "Kiss 98-5, Kiss Again 103-3" format was tweaked again to rival 104.1 KRBE, by playing Rock and Pop based Top 40.

On January 1, 1999, the station jumped on the Rhythmic Oldies bandwagon as "98.5 The Jam". The call letters were changed to KTJM to match the new branding,  becoming only the third set of call letters assigned to the facility since its sign on.

From 1999 to 2001, the station's moniker changed to "Houston's Jammin' Oldies," then to "Houston's Jammin' Hits", accompanied by a slight tweak in the playlist each time.

In July 2001, the station flipped to the current Regional Mexican "La Raza" format after being bought by Liberman Broadcasting.  In 2019, Liberman ran into financial problems and declared Chapter 11.  After reorganization, the corporate name changed to Estrella Media.

References

External links 
LaRaza Radio of Houston

Mexican-American culture in Houston
TJM
Regional Mexican radio stations in the United States
Radio stations established in 1977
Estrella Media stations